Dyadobacter alkalitolerans  is a Gram-negative, aerobic, rod-shaped and non-motile bacterium from the genus of Dyadobacter which has been isolated from desert sand in Xinjiang in China.

References

External links
 Type strain of Dyadobacter alkalitolerans at BacDive -  the Bacterial Diversity Metadatabase	

Cytophagia
Bacteria described in 2009